In music, four note group patterns, alternately called "four-note digital patterns" or simply "four note patterns", are one of many ways to formulate improvised solos in jazz. "Four-Note Grouping is an improvisation technique that uses major and minor triads along with specific passing notes as a means of generating lines. The concept of Four-Note Groupings lets the lines be more 'out' and stretch the possibility of available notes over a chord due to the structural integrity of the triad-based line."

Four note group devices 
 Diatonic scale fragment
 Arpeggio (of current chord, altered harmony or an implied passing chord)
Chromatic approach note (a note preceding a chord tone or scale tone one semitone above or below)
Chromatic surround notes (two notes preceding a chord tone one semitone above and below)
Pentatonic scale fragment

Examples 
John Coltrane: "Giant Steps" solo

See also
Sequence (music)

Sources

External links
"Four Note Groupings Part 2", EdSaindon.com (351 KB PDF) - Ed Saindon
Javier Arau. "Augmented Scale Theory", Javier Arau - Faculty of Saxophone/Woodwind, in NEW YORK JAZZ ACADEMY.
Michael Leibson. "Giant Steps, Central Park West and Modulatory Cycles", ThinkingMusic.ca.

Jazz techniques
Musical techniques